The first season of The Four Brasil, hosted by Xuxa Meneghel and judged by Aline Wirley, João Marcello Bôscoli and Leo Chaves, premiered Wednesday, February 6, 2019 at 10:30 p.m. (BRT / AMT) on RecordTV. The winner is awarded a R$300.000 cash prize.

The Four
Key
 – Challenger against The Four won and secured a seat as a new member.
 – Member of The Four did not perform.
 – Member of The Four won the challenge and secured a seat.
 – Member of The Four lost the challenge and was eliminated.
 – Challenger to The Four lost the challenge and was eliminated.
 – Artist was chosen to return and earned a chance to challenge The Four.
 – Artist was chosen to return but lost the chance to challenge The Four.
 – Artist was not in the competition.
 – Final member of The Four.

Challenge episodes
Key
 – Artist secured a spot and has remained in The Four.
 – Artist won the challenge but was eventually eliminated.
 – Artist was eliminated.

Week 1 (Feb. 06)
Group performance: "I Want It All" / "We Will Rock You"

Week 2 (Feb. 13)
Group performance: "Vem Quente Que Eu Estou Fervendo"

Week 3 (Feb. 20)
Group performance: "Rumour Has It / Someone like You"

Week 4 (Feb. 27)
Group performance: "Get Lucky" / "Ainda É Cedo"

Week 5 (Mar. 06)
Group performance: "It's My Life"

Week 6 (Mar. 13)
Group performance: "Runnin' (Lose It All)"

Comeback episode

Week 7 (Mar. 20)
Group performance: "Stronger (What Doesn't Kill You)"

Part 1: Head-to-Head Battle
The comeback artists are split into pairs for their first performances. The audience selected one from each pair to immediately challenge one of the members of "The Four".

Part 2: Comeback Challenge
After winning their Head-to-Head battles, the four comeback artists each immediately challenged a member of "The Four" for an opportunity to claim a seat.

Finale

Week 8 (Mar. 27)
Group performance: "This Is Me"
Musical guest: Ludmilla ("Clichê" / "Cheguei")

Part 1: Head-to-Head Battle
Each finalist performed two songs. For the first song, each finalist performed in hopes of winning over the audience. After performing, the audience voted for their favorite performance, and the finalist with the most votes earned the power to choose who they wanted to battle against in the head-to-head challenge. For the second song, each selected pair went head-to-head. The public picked a winner from each pair to move on to the final battle.

Part 2: The Final Two Battle
For the final battle, the two finalists performed once more for the votes from the Brazilian public. The winner of this battle would be crowned the winner of The Four Brasil.

Following the announcement that Lima had won, he performed "Angels".

Ratings and reception

Brazilian ratings
All numbers are in points and provided by Kantar Ibope Media.

References

External links
 The Four Brasil on R7.com

2019 Brazilian television seasons